The 6th Virginia Cavalry Regiment was a cavalry regiment raised in Virginia for service in the Confederate States Army during the American Civil War. It fought mostly with the Army of Northern Virginia.

On September 11, 1861, Kentucky-born West Point graduate Col. Charles William Field, who had commanded the Cavalry Camp of Instruction in Ashland, Virginia with the assistance of Capt. Lunsford L. Lomax beginning in late June 1861, was appointed Colonel of the new 6th Regiment of Virginia Volunteer Cavalry. Initially, his Lt.Col. was Williams C. Wickham, and Dr. J. Grattan Cabell of Richmond named the unit's Major. Col. Field initially divided the unit into seven companies, but the Governor's Guard and Henrico Light Dragoons never arrived (instead becoming Company I of the 4th Virginia Cavalry and 10th Virginia Cavalry, respectively), so the Clarke Cavalry and Rockingham Cavalry were substituted. Wickham also was reassigned before arrival, so Julian Harrison (a major planter and slaveholder from Columbia, Goochland County, Virginia) became the unit's initial Lt. Col. Some of the named companies had already seen action; others were newly formed.

Col. Field completed organizing Virginia's 6th Cavalry by November, 1861, at Manassas, Virginia. The Georgia Hussars arrived despite Georgia Governor Joseph E. Brown's objection to their having accepted state funds to arm, but following a skirmish near Burke's Station in Fairfax County, Virginia were assigned to the Jefferson Davis Legion of Mississippi Cavalry in December. As shown below, men of this unit were raised in Loudoun, Rappahannock, Clarke, Rockingham, Fairfax, Halifax, Pittsylvania, Jefferson, Frederick, Wise and Orange counties.

When Col. Field was promoted to brigadier general of infantry, the unit was reorganized and the Pittsylvania Dragoons, led by Capt. Thomas Stanhope Flournoy's son, added. On April 15, 1862, Julian Harrison was named colonel of the 6th Virginia Cavalry, Dr. J. Grattan Cabell was promoted to lieutenant colonel, and Thomas S. Flournoy became the company's major. Flournoy, a prominent Virginia Whig had been a United States Congressman as well as an unsuccessful candidate for Virginia governor from the anti-Catholic and anti-immigrant Know Nothing Party in 1855. However, by month's end the reorganization changed pursuant to new legislation passed by the Confederate Congress which not only authorized conscription, but also promoted reorganization through election of officers, so 20 lieutenants and captains in the 6th Virginia cavalry failed to win their troop's confidence lost their commissions. The second reorganization that month promoted Flournoy to lieutenant colonel, and John ("Shac") Shackelford Green (despite being voted out as captain) became the unit's major. At this time, the 6th Cavalry and 2nd Virginia Cavalry were also assigned to Ewell's Division under Col. Thomas T. Munford's command to reinforce Gen. Stonewall Jackson in the Shenandoah Valley.
 
The unit later served in Robertson's, “Grumble” Jones', Lomax's, and Payne's Brigade, Army of Northern Virginia. It fought in Jackson's Valley Campaign and in the conflicts at Second Bull Run, Brandy Station, Upperville, Fairfield, Bristoe, Mine Run, The Wilderness, Todd's Tavern, Spotsylvania, Haw's Shop, and Cold Harbor. The regiment went on to take part in Early's Shenandoah Valley operations and the Appomattox Campaign.

Only 3 men surrendered on April 9, 1865, as most of the cavalry cut through the Federal lines and later disbanded. The field officers were Colonels Charles W. Field, Thomas Flournoy, John S. Green, and Julien Harrison; Lieutenant Colonels J. Grattan Cabell and Daniel T. Richards; and Majors Cabell E. Flournoy and Daniel A. Grimsley.

Field officers
Colonel Charles W. Field
Colonel Thomas S. Flourney, Commanding Officer on the Sharpsburg Campaign
Colonel John S. Green
Colonel Julien Harrison
Lieutenant Colonel J. Grattan Cabell
Lieutenant Colonel Daniel T. Richards
Major Cabell E. Flournoy
Major Daniel A. Grimsley

See also

List of Virginia Civil War units

References

Units and formations of the Confederate States Army from Virginia
1861 establishments in Virginia
Military units and formations established in 1861
1865 disestablishments in Virginia
Military units and formations disestablished in 1865